Buttrick is a surname. Notable people with the surname include:

Barbara Buttrick (born 1930), English boxer
Ellen Buttrick (born 1995), British Paralympic rower 
George Arthur Buttrick (1892–1980), English-born, American-based Christian preacher, author and lecturer
John Buttrick (1731–1791), American Revolutionary War militiaman